Faster than the speed of light, or more simply faster than light, may refer to:

Faster-than-light travel and communication
Superluminal motion, faster-than-light motion
Superluminal communication, faster-than-light communication
Faster Than the Speed of Light: The Story of a Scientific Speculation, a book by João Magueijo
"Faster Than the Speed of Light", a song by Raven
"Faster Than the Speed of Light", a song written by Yngwie Malmsteen
Faster Than Light (software publisher), a defunct computer game company
Faster Than Light, a song from the soundtrack of the 2016 video game Stellaris
 FTL Games (Faster Than Light) was the video game development division of Software Heaven Inc.
FTL: Faster Than Light, a PC video game

See also
Faster Than the Speed of Night, an album by Bonnie Tyler
Speed of light (disambiguation)
Stardrive (disambiguation), a term for FTL drive